Skunk Creek is a  stream in Lake County, Minnesota, United States.  It is a tributary of the Gooseberry River.

See also
List of rivers of Minnesota

References

External links
Minnesota Watersheds
USGS Hydrologic Unit Map - State of Minnesota (1974)

Rivers of Minnesota
Rivers of Lake County, Minnesota